Burlington City Council is the city council responsible for the city of Burlington, Ontario, Canada. The council consists of the mayor plus six councillors.

Current City Council (2022-2026)
Council elected in the 2022 municipal election:

Past City Councils

2018-2022 
Council elected in the 2018 municipal election:

 Marianne Meed Ward - Mayor
 Kevin Galbraith - Ward 1
 Lisa Kearns  - Ward 2
 Rory Nisan - Ward 3
 Shawna Stolte - Ward 4
 Paul Sharman - Ward 5
 Angelo Bentivegna - Ward 6

2014-2018 
Council elected in the 2014 municipal election:

 Rick Goldring - Mayor
 Rick Craven - Ward 1
 Marianne Meed Ward - Ward 2
 John Taylor - Ward 3
 Jack Dennison - Ward 4
 Paul Sharman - Ward 5
 Blair Lancaster - Ward 6

2010-2014
Council elected in the 2010 municipal election:

Rick Goldring - Mayor
Rick Craven - Ward 1
Marianne Meed Ward - Ward 2
John Taylor - Ward 3
Jack Dennison - Ward 4
Paul Sharman - Ward 5
 Blair Lancaster - Ward 6

2006-2010
Council elected in the 2006 municipal election:

Cam Jackson - Mayor
Rick Craven - Ward 1
Peter Thoem - Ward 2
John Taylor - Ward 3
Jack Dennison - Ward 4
Rick Goldring - Ward 5
Carol D'Amelio - Ward 6

References

Municipal councils in Ontario
Politics of Burlington, Ontario